(born August 21, 1942, in Tokyo Metropolis) is a Japanese actor. He has appeared in several episodes of the Ultra Series.

TV 
Ambassador Magma (1966-1967)
Ultra Seven (1967-1968) - Ultra Seven
Fight! Mighty Jack
Return of Ultraman (1971) - Ultraman Jack / Zazahn / MAT Communication Worker
Kaiketsu Lion-Maru 
Ultraman Ace
Ultraman Taro
Denjin Zaborger
J.A.K.Q. Dengekitai
Spider-Man (tokusatsu)
Battle Fever J
Ultraman 80
Dai Sentai Goggle V (1982-1983, 15 episodes) - Dr. Iguana
Kyojuu Tokusou Juspion (1985, Episodes 25 & 26) - Gazami brother #1
Gridman the Hyper Agent
Ultraman Dyna
Ultraman Nexus
Ultraman Mebius (2006) - President of the Kikuchi Electric Appliances Company

Films 
You Only Live Twice (1967) - Hitman (uncredited)
Number Ten Blues (1975)
The Monster X Strikes Back/Attack the G8 Summit (2008)
Executive Koala (2005)

References 

Japanese male film actors
1942 births
Living people